Milton Aster Small (born 12 February 1964) is a former West Indian cricketer who played in two Tests and two ODIs in 1984.

References

1964 births
Living people
West Indies Test cricketers
West Indies One Day International cricketers
Barbadian cricketers
Barbados cricketers